

R 

 R. B. Braithwaite
 R. De Staningtona
 R. Edward Freeman
 R. G. Collingwood
 R. James Long
 R. Jay Wallace
 R. M. Hare
 R. R. Rockingham Gill
 Rabbinic law
 Rabia al-Adawiyya
 Rabindranath Tagore
 Rabirius (Epicurean)
 Race (classification of human beings)
 Race to the bottom
 Rachel Elior
 Rachida Triki
 Racialism (Racial categorization)
 Racism
 Rada Iveković
 Radical Aristotelianism
 Radical behaviorism
 Radical behaviourism
 Radical democracy
 Radical empiricism
 Radical Evolution
 Radical feminism
 Radical interpretation
 Radical Philosophy
 Radical Philosophy Review
 Radical skepticism
 Radical translation
 Radical Unintelligibility
 Radio libertaire
 Rado Riha
 Radovan Richta
 Radulfus Ardens
 Radulphus Brito
 Raegan Butcher
 Rafael Calvo Serer
 Rafe Champion
 Raghavan N. Iyer
 Raghunatha Siromani
 Rahbani brothers
 Raili Kauppi
 Raimo Tuomela
 Raimond Gaita
 Raimundo Teixeira Mendes
 Rainer Forst
 Rainer Maria Rilke
 Raïssa Maritain
 Raja Yoga
 Rajas
 Ralph Barton Perry
 Ralph Cudworth
 Ralph Johnson (philosopher)
 Ralph of Longchamp
 Ralph Strode
 Ralph Tyler Flewelling
 Ralph Waldo Emerson
 Ralstonism
 Ramanuja
 Ramchandra Gandhi
 Rameau's Nephew
 Ramification problem
 Ramified type theory
 Ramin Jahanbegloo
 Ramism
 Ramist movement
 Ramón José Sender Garcés
 Ramon Llull
 Ramon Vila Capdevila
 Ramón Xirau
 Ramsey–Lewis method
 Ramsey Kanaan
 Randal Marlin
 Randall Auxier
 Randall Swingler
 Randian hero
 Random act of kindness
 Randomness
 Range of a function
 Ranjana Khanna
 Raoul Vaneigem
 Raphaël Enthoven
 Raphael M. Robinson
 Raphael von Koeber
 Rasa (aesthetics)
 Rate of exploitation
 Rate of profit
 Ratio (journal)
 Ratio scale
 Ratiocination
 Rational agent
 Rational animal
 Rational choice theory
 Rational consequence relation
 Rational egoism
 Rational fideism
 Rational ignorance
 Rational love
 Rational mysticism
 Rational number
 Rational reconstruction
 Rational Response Squad
 Rationalism
 Rationality
 Rationalization
 Rationalization (psychology)
 Ratnatraya
 Ravachol
 Raven paradox
 Raw feels
 Ray Brassier
 Ray Jackendoff
 Ray Monk
 Raymond Aron
 Raymond Duncan
 Raymond Geuss
 Raymond Klibansky
 Raymond Polin
 Raymond Ruyer
 Raymond Smullyan
 Raymond Tallis
 Razor (philosophy)
 Re.press
 Reaction
 Reactionary
 Reading Capital
 Real
 Real atheism
 Real freedom
 Real number
 Real self
 Real socialism
 Realism
 Realism in international relations
 Reality
 Reality enforcement
 Reality in Buddhism
 Reality principle
 Reality tunnel
 Realizability
 Realization
 Really Really Free Market
 Realphilosophie
 Reason
 Reason (argument)
 Reason (logic)
 Reason and Revolution
 Reasonable doubt
 Reasoning
 Reasons and Persons
 Reasons externalism
 Reasons internalism
 Rebecca Goldstein
 Rebirth
 Rebirth (Buddhism)
 Recall bias
 Received view
 Received view of theories
 Recherches husserliennes
 Rechtsstaat
 Recipes for Disaster
 Reciprocal altruism
 Reciprocity
 Reciprocity (social and political philosophy)
 Recognition
 Recognizable language
 Reconstructivism
 Rectification of Names
 Recuperation (sociology)
 Recurrence
 Recursion
 Recursive function
 Recursive function theory
 Recursive language
 Recursively enumerable language
 Red and Anarchist Skinheads
 Red Emma's Bookstore Coffeehouse
 Redintegration
 Redistribution
 Redpill
 Reduct
 Reductio ad absurdum
 Reductio ad Hitlerum
 Reduction (philosophy)
 Reductionism
 Redundancy (language)
 Redundancy theory of truth
 Reed–Muller expansion
 Reference
 Referential
 Referential opacity
 Referential transparency
 Referentially transparent
 Reflection principles
 Reflections on the Revolution in France
 Reflective disclosure
 Reflective equilibrium
 Reflectivism
 Reflexive
 Reflexive monism
 Reflexivity
 Reform
 Reform Judaism
 Reformational philosophy
 Reformed epistemology
 Reformism
 Refusal of work
 Regeneración
 Reginald Garrigou-Lagrange
 Reginald Hackforth
 Reginald Ray
 Regionalism (art)
 Regress
 Regress argument
 Regression analysis
 Regression fallacy
 Regular grammar
 Regular language
 Regular modal logic
 Regular tree grammar
 Regulation of science
 Regulative principle
 Regulative principles
 Reification (fallacy)
 Reification (Marxism)
 Reincarnation
 Reinhart Maurer
 Reinhold Niebuhr
 Reism
 Relation
 Relation of Ideas
 Relational quantum mechanics
 Relational semantics
 Relational space
 Relational theory
 Relationalism
 Relations of production
 Relationship between Friedrich Nietzsche and Max Stirner
 Relationship between religion and science
 Relationship ethics
 Relative value
 Relativism
 Relativist fallacy
 Relativity of knowledge
 Relativity of simultaneity
 Relativity theory
 Relevance
 Relevance logic
 Relevance theory
 Relevant alternatives theory
 Reliabilism
 Religio Medici
 Religion
 Religion & Ethics Newsweekly
 Religion and abortion
 Religion and agriculture
 Religion and happiness
 Religion and science
 Religion of Humanity
 Religion within the Bounds of Bare Reason
 Religious belief
 Religious communism
 Religious democracy
 Religious experience
 Religious humanism
 Religious intellectualism in Iran
 Religious interpretation
 Religious interpretations of the Big Bang theory
 Religious language
 Religious law
 Religious liberalism
 Religious naturalism
 Religious philosophy
 Religious pluralism
 Religious skepticism
 Religious views on business ethics
 Religious views on suicide
 Rémi Brague
 Remigius of Auxerre
 Reminiscence
 Remo Bodei
 Remorse
 Ren Jiyu
 Renaissance
 Renaissance humanism
 Renaissance philosophy
 Renate Holub
 Renato Janine Ribeiro
 René Descartes
 René Girard
 René Guénon
 Rene Guenon: A Teacher for Modern Times
 René Viénet
 Renewing the Anarchist Tradition
 Renn Dickson Hampden
 Rentier capitalism
 Renzo Novatore
 Repertorium der Nederlandse Wijsbegeerte
 Repetition (Kierkegaard)
 Representation (arts)
 Representation (psychology)
 Representation theorem
 Representational theory of mind
 Representationalism
 Representative democracy
 Representative realism
 Repressive hypothesis
 Reprobation
 Reproducibility
 Reproduction (economics)
 Reproductive technology
 Reprogenetics
 Republican democracy
 Republicanism
 Res Cogitans
 Res Extensa
 Research ethics
 Resentment
 Resistentialism
 Resolution (logic)
 Resources for clinical ethics consultation
 Respect
 Respondent conditioning
 Response bias
 Response variable
 Ressentiment
 Restorative justice
 Resurrection
 Retention and protention
 Reterritorialization
 Rethinking "Gnosticism": An Argument for Dismantling a Dubious Category
 Retributive justice
 Retributivism
 Retrocausality
 Retrocausation
 Retroduction
 Retrospective determinism
 Revealed truth
 Revelation
 Revenge
 Reverence for Life
 Reverse Turing test
 Review of Metaphysics
 Review of Philosophy and Psychology
 Revisionism (Marxism)
 Revista Ideas y Valores
 Revolt
 Revolt Against the Modern World
 Revolution
 Revolutionary Anarchist Bowling League
 Revolutionary Insurrectionary Army of Ukraine
 Revolutionary integrationism
 Revolutionary spontaneity
 Revolutions in Mathematics
 Revue de métaphysique et de morale
 Revue de synthèse
 Revue philosophique de la France et de l'étranger
 Revue Philosophique de Louvain
 Rewriting
 Rhazes
 Rhetoric
 Rhetoric (Aristotle)
 Rhetoric of science
 Rhetoric of social intervention model
 Rhetoric to Alexander
 Rhetorical criticism
 Rhetorical reason
 Rhizome (philosophy)
 Rhyme
 Rhythmanalysis
 Ricardo Rozzi
 Richard's paradox
 Richard-Bevan Braithwaite
 Richard A. Macksey
 Richard Alan Cross
 Richard Arneson
 Richard Avenarius
 Richard Bach
 Richard Baron (philosopher)
 Richard Bentley
 Richard Boyd
 Richard Brandt
 Richard Brinkley
 Richard Burthogge
 Richard Carrier
 Richard Cumberland (philosopher)
 Richard Dawkins
 Richard Dedekind
 Richard E. Flathman
 Richard Ferrybridge
 Richard Grathoff
 Richard Gregg (social philosopher)
 Richard Haldane, 1st Viscount Haldane
 Richard Hanley
 Richard Hönigswald
 Richard Hooker
 Richard Ithamar Aaron
 Richard J. Bernstein
 Richard J. F. Day
 Richard Jeffrey
 Richard Kearney
 Richard Kilvington
 Richard Kirkham
 Richard Kroner
 Richard Lewis Nettleship
 Richard M. Weaver
 Richard McKeon
 Richard Meltzer
 Richard Merett Montague
 Richard Mervyn Hare
 Richard Milton Martin
 Richard Montague
 Richard of Campsall
 Richard of Cornwall
 Richard of Middleton
 Richard of Saint Victor
 Richard of St Victor
 Richard Overton
 Richard Payne Knight
 Richard Popkin
 Richard Price
 Richard Rorty
 Richard Rudolf Walzer
 Richard Rufus
 Richard Rufus of Cornwall
 Richard Sault
 Richard Schacht
 Richard Shusterman
 Richard Sorabji
 Richard Swinburne
 Richard Swineshead
 Richard Sylvan
 Richard Tarnas
 Richard Taylor (philosopher)
 Richard the Sophister
 Richard Thomas Nolan
 Richard von Mises
 Richard von Schubert-Soldern
 Richard W. Miller
 Richard Wahle
 Richard Walker (philosopher)
 Richard Whately
 Richard Wilton
 Richard Wolin
 Richard Wollheim
 Richards controller
 Rick Lewis (journalist)
 Rick Turner (philosopher)
 Ride the Tiger
 Rieko
 Rifa'a el-Tahtawi
 Right-libertarianism
 Right action
 Right Hegelians
 Right of revolution
 Right quotient
 Right to exist
 Righteousness
 Rights
 Rights Ethics
 Rights of Englishmen
 Rights of Man
 Rights of the Terminally Ill Act 1995
 Rigid designator
 Rigorism
 Rigour
 Rigpa
 Rinchen Zangpo
 Ring of Gyges
 Rising Tide North America
 Risk
 Risk assessment
 Ritual
 Ritual purification
 Rival Lovers
 Rıza Tevfik Bölükbaşı
 RNC 8
 RNC Welcoming Committee
 Road to Freedom (journal)
 Robbins algebra
 Robert A. McDermott
 Robert Adamson (philosopher)
 Robert Alexy
 Robert Allinson
 Robert Alyngton
 Robert Arrington
 Robert Audi
 Robert B. Pippin
 Robert Balfour (philosopher)
 Robert Bernasconi
 Robert Boyle
 Robert Brandom
 Robert Bruce Raup
 Robert C. Solomon
 Robert C. Stalnaker
 Robert Cowton
 Robert Cummings Neville
 Robert F. Almeder
 Robert Feys
 Robert Filmer
 Robert Flint
 Robert Fludd
 Robert Frodeman
 Robert Graham (historian)
 Robert Grosseteste
 Robert Grudin
 Robert Holcot
 Robert Holkot
 Robert J. Zydenbos
 Robert Joseph Pothier
 Robert Kane (philosopher)
 Robert Kilwardby
 Robert Kirk
 Robert Kowalski
 Robert L. Holmes
 Robert Lawson Vaught
 Robert Leslie Ellis
 Robert M. Pirsig
 Robert M. Solovay
 Robert Magliola
 Robert Maximilian de Gaynesford
 Robert Merrihew Adams
 Robert Nozick
 Robert of Melun
 Robert P. Crease
 Robert P. George
 Robert Paul Wolff
 Robert Pullus
 Robert Redeker
 Robert Rowland Smith
 Robert S. Boyer
 Robert S. Corrington
 Robert S. Hartman
 Robert Saitschick
 Robert Spaemann
 Robert Stalnaker
 Robert T. Pennock
 Robert Todd Carroll
 Robert Trundle
 Robert Vischer
 Robert von Zimmermann
 Robert Wardy
 Roberto Ardigò
 Roberto Carifi
 Roberto Mangabeira Unger
 Roberto Refinetti
 Roberto Torretti
 Robin Attfield
 Robin Collins
 Robin Gandy
 Robin Hahnel
 Robin LePoidevin
 Roboethics
 Robot
 Rod Coronado
 Rod L. Evans
 Roderick Chisholm
 Rodolfo Mondolfo
 Rodolphe Gasché
 Rodolphus Agricola
 Roger-Pol Droit
 Roger Bacon
 Roger Caillois
 Roger de Piles
 Roger Fry
 Roger Garaudy
 Roger Joseph Boscovich
 Roger Marston
 Roger North (17th century)
 Roger Penrose
 Roger Scruton
 Rogerian argument
 Rogers Albritton
 Rói Patursson
 Roland Barthes
 Roland Fraïssé
 Roland of Cremona
 Rolf Sattler
 Rolf Schock
 Rolf Schock Prizes
 Rolling Thunder (journal)
 Roman Ingarden
 Roman law
 Roman philosophy
 Roman Witold Ingarden
 Romanas Plečkaitis
 Romanian philosophy
 Romantic realism
 Romanticism
 Ron McClamrock
 Ronald de Sousa
 Ronald Dworkin
 Ronald Giere
 Ronald Jensen
 Ronald Loui
 Ronald M. Dworkin
 Ronald Paulson
 Root cause
 Rosa Luxemburg
 Rosalind Hursthouse
 Roscelin de Compiegne
 Roscellinus
 Roscoe Pound
 Rose Pesotta
 Rose Rand
 Rosminians
 Ross Winn
 Rota Fortunae
 Rotation method
 Round square copula
 Routledge Encyclopedia of Philosophy
 Roy Bhaskar
 Roy Wood Sellars
 Royal Institute of Philosophy
 Rüdiger Safranski
 Rudolf Arnheim
 Rudolf Bultmann
 Rudolf Carnap
 Rudolf Christoph Eucken
 Rudolf Haym
 Rudolf Hermann
 Rudolf Lingens
 Rudolf Maria Holzapfel
 Rudolf Otto
 Rudolf Rocker
 Rudolf Schottlaender
 Rudolf Seydel
 Rudolf Steiner
 Rudolf von Jhering
 Rudolph Göckel
 Rudolph Goclenius
 Rudolphus Goclenius
 Rufus Jones (writer)
 Ruhollah Khomeini
 Rule by decree
 Rule egoism
 Rule of inference
 Rule of law
 Rule of Recognition
 Rule of Rescue
 Rule of Three (Wiccan)
 Rule utilitarianism
 Rules for the Direction of the Mind
 Rules of passage (logic)
 Ruling class
 Rune Slagstad
 Rupert Read
 Rush Rhees
 Rushworth Kidder
 Russ Shafer-Landau
 Russell's paradox
 Russell's teapot
 Russell Kirk
 Russian cosmism
 Russian formalism
 Russian philosophy
 Ruth Abbey
 Ruth Barcan Marcus
 Ruth Macklin
 Ruth Millikan
 Ruth Nanda Anshen
 Ryle's regress
 Ryosen Tsunashima

S 

 S. Barry Cooper
 S. Morris Engel
 S5 (modal logic)
 Saadiah Gaon
 Sacco and Vanzetti
 Sacco and Vanzetti (2006 film)
 Sacco e Vanzetti (1971 film)
 Sacraments
 Sacred
 Sacrifice
 Sadaqah
 Sadayoshi Fukuda
 Sadiq Jalal al-Azm
 Sadr al-Din al-Qunawi
 Sadr al-Din Muhammad al-Shirazi
 Sadvipras
 Safety
 Sage (Sophos)
 Saggi sull'idealismo magico
 Saguna brahman
 Sahotra Sarkar
 Sail Mohamed
 Saint-Simonism
 Saint Genet
 Saint Petersburg paradox
 Saint Teresa of Avila
 Saints and Revolutionaries
 Sakadagami
 Sakae Osugi
 Saktism
 Śālikanātha
 Sallustius of Emesa
 Salomon Maimon
 Salon Mazal
 Salva veritate
 Salvador Seguí
 Salvation
 Sam Dolgoff
 Sam Gillespie
 Sam Harris (author)
 Sam Keen
 Sam Mainwaring
 Samādhi
 Samaritan's dilemma
 Samatha
 Samayasāra
 Sambhogakāya
 Sami Nair
 Adi Shankara
 Samkhya
 Samkhyakarika
 Samkhyapravachana Sutra
 Sampling bias
 Samsara
 Saṃsāra (Buddhism)
 Samsara (Jainism)
 Samuel Alexander
 Samuel Bailey
 Samuel Bowles (economist)
 Samuel Butler (novelist)
 Samuel Cabanchik
 Samuel Clarke
 Samuel de Sorbiere
 Samuel Guttenplan
 Samuel ibn Seneh Zarza
 Samuel Johnson
 Samuel Johnson's religious views
 Samuel Johnson (1649–1703)
 Samuel Johnson (pamphleteer)
 Samuel Maximilian Rieser
 Samuel Pufendorf
 Samuel Ramos
 Samuel Taylor Coleridge
 Samuel Todes
 Samuel von Pufendorf
 Samvriti
 San Diego Free Speech Fight
 Sandhi
 Sandie Lindsay, 1st Baron Lindsay of Birker
 Sandra Bartky
 Sandra Harding
 Sandra Laugier
 Sandra Mitchell
 Saneatsu Mushanokōji
 Sanjaya Belatthaputta
 Sankhara
 Sankhya
 Sanlun
 Sansara
 Śāntarakṣita
 Sante Geronimo Caserio
 Sapere aude
 Sapir–Whorf hypothesis
 Sarah Coakley
 Sarah Kofman
 Sarane Alexandrian
 Sarvepalli Radhakrishnan
 Sarye pyeollam
 Sascha Scatter
 Sascha Schapiro
 Sat (Sanskrit)
 Satchitananda
 Sathya Sai Baba
 Satisfiability and validity
 Satisfiable
 Satisfice
 Satisficing
 Satori
 Saturday Club (Boston, Massachusetts)
 Satya
 Satyagraha
 Satyrus the Peripatetic
 Saul Aaron Kripke
 Saul Yanovsky
 Sautrāntika
 Saving the Appearances: A Study in Idolatry
 Savior sibling
 Sayyid al-Qimni
 Sayyid Qutb
 Scalar implicature
 Scandal (theology)
 Scarlat Callimachi
 Scepticism
 Scepticism and Animal Faith
 Sceptics
 Schadenfreude
 Scheler's Stratification of Emotional Life
 Schema (Kant)
 Scheme (linguistics)
 Schizoanalysis
 Scholarch
 Scholastic method
 Scholasticism
 School for Ethics and Global Leadership
 School of Brentano
 School of Names
 School of Saint Victor
 School of Salamanca
 School of thought
 Schopenhauer's criticism of Kant's schemata
 Schopenhauer's criticism of the Kantian philosophy
 Schopenhauer's criticism of the proofs of the parallel postulate
 Schröder–Bernstein theorem
 Schrödinger equation
 Science
 Science and Christian Belief
 Science and religion
 Science of Logic
 Science of man
 Scientific Communism
 Scientific determinism
 Scientific essentialism
 Scientific explanation
 Scientific instruments
 Scientific knowledge
 Scientific law
 Scientific method
 Scientific misconduct
 Scientific modelling
 Scientific progress
 Scientific realism
 Scientific revolution
 Scientific theories
 Scientific theory
 Scientism
 Scientistic materialism
 Scientists for Global Responsibility
 SCIgen
 Scotism
 Scott Buchanan
 Scott Soames
 Scottish common sense philosophy
 Scottish School of Common Sense
 Scudder Klyce
 Scythianus
 Sea battle
 Sea of Beauty
 Search for a Method
 Sebastián Fox Morcillo
 Sebastian Miczyński
 Sebastian Petrycy
 Sebastian Shaumyan
 Sebastiano Maffettone
 Sébastien Faure Century
 Second-order logic
 Second-order predicate
 Second Alcibiades
 Second law of thermodynamics
 Second Letter (Plato)
 Second scholasticism
 Secondary antisemitism
 Secondary qualities
 Secondary reference
 Secondness
 Sectarian democracy
 Secular ethics
 Secular humanism
 Secular saint
 Secular theology
 Secularism
 Secularism in the Middle East
 Secularization
 Secundum quid
 Secundus the Silent
 Security culture
 Sediq Afghan
 Seeing
 Sefer ha-Ikkarim
 Sefer ha-Qabbalah
 Segundo Blanco
 Seiichi Hatano
 Selection
 Selective perception
 Self-awareness
 Self-compassion
 Self-concept (Philosophy)
 Self-consciousness
 Self-control
 Self-deception
 Self-defeating prophecy
 Self-determination
 Self-efficacy
 Self-evidence
 Self-fulfilling prophecy
 Self-Indication Assumption
 Self-Indication Assumption Doomsday argument rebuttal
 Self-love
 Self-organizing system
 Self-preservation
 Self-realization
 Self-reference
 Self-reference puzzle
 Self-referencing doomsday argument rebuttal
 Self-refuting idea
 Self-Reliance
 Self-respect
 Self-serving bias
 Self (philosophy)
 Self control
 Selfishness
 Semantic consequence
 Semantic externalism
 Semantic holism
 Semantic paradox
 Semantic primes
 Semantic tableaux
 Semantic theory of truth
 Semantic view of theories
 Semantics
 Semantics encoding
 Semen Liudvigovich Frank
 Semi-Thue system
 Semiautomaton
 Semiosis
 Semiotic
 Semiotics
 Seneca's Consolations
 Seneca the Younger
 Seng-chao
 Sengzhao
 Seniority
 Sensationalism
 Sense
 Sense-data
 Sense and reference
 Sense and Sensibilia (Aristotle)
 Sense and Sensibilia (Austin)
 Sense data
 Sense of agency
 Sensibility
 Sensorium
 Sensualism
 Sensus communis
 Sentence (linguistics)
 Sentences
 Sentential calculus
 Sentential connective
 Sentential function
 Sentience
 Feeling
 Sentimental poetry
 Sentimentalism (philosophy)
 Senya Fleshin
 Seo Gyeong-deok
 Seosan
 Sequent calculus
 Sequential logic
 Serge Moscovici
 Sergei Adian
 Sergei Bulgakov
 Sergei Nikolaevich Trubetskoy
 Sergio Panunzio
 Serial position effect
 Set-theoretic reflection principles
 Set (mathematics)
 Set theory
 Seth Benardete
 Seth Material
 Seven deadly sins
 Seven Factors of Enlightenment
 Seven Life Lessons of Chaos
 Seven Sages of Greece
 Seven Sins of Medicine
 Seven virtues
 Seven Worthies of the Bamboo Grove
 Seventeen Rules of Enjuin
 Seventh Letter (Plato)
 Sex and Character
 Sex, Ecology, Spirituality
 Sexism
 Sextus Empiricus
 Sextus of Chaeronea
 Sexual attraction
 Sexual ethics
 Sexual harassment
 Sexual morality
 Seyla Benhabib
 Shabda
 Shadworth Holloway Hodgson
 Shahab al-Din Suhrawardi
 Shakespeare's Politics (book)
 Shakti
 Shalva Nutsubidze
 Shamanism
 Shame
 Shang Yang
 Shangdi
 Shankara (philosopher)
 Shannon's expansion
 Shannon Bell
 Shantideva
 Shao Yong
 Sharia
 Sharps waste
 Sharyn Clough
 Shastrartha
 Shaun Gallagher (philosopher)
 Shaun Nichols
 Sheffer stroke
 Shelly Kagan
 Shem-Tov ibn Falaquera
 Shem Mishmuel
 Shemariah of Negropont
 Shen (Chinese religion)
 Shen Buhai
 Shen Dao
 Shen Kuo
 Shen Pu-hai
 Shenhui
 Sherman Austin
 Sherrilyn Roush
 Sherry L. Ackerman
 Sherwin Wine
 Shibui
 Shihab al-Din Yahya al-Suhrawardi
 Shihab al-Din Yahya Sohravardi
 Shin'ichi Hisamatsu
 Shin hanga
 Shinran
 Shinto
 Ship of state
 Ship of Theseus
 Shiva
 Shizuteru Ueda
 Shmuel Alexandrov
 Shoshin
 Shriek
 Shu Han
 Shunsuke Tsurumi
 Shunyata
 Shūsui Kōtoku
 Siddhanta
 Siddhartha Gautama
 Sidney Hook
 Sidney Morgenbesser
 Siegfried Kracauer
 Sienese School
 Siger of Brabant
 Sigmund Freud
 Sign
 Sign (semiotics)
 Significant other
 Sign (semiotics)
 Sikh art and culture
 Sikh philosophy
 Silhak
 Silver machine
 Silver Rule
 Silvio Ceccato
 Simeon ben Zemah Duran
 Simion Bărnuţiu
 Simmias of Syracuse
 Simmias of Thebes
 Simon Blackburn
 Simon Critchley
 Simon Foucher
 Simon of Faversham
 Simon of Tournai
 Simon Oosterman
 Simon Soloveychik
 Simon the Shoemaker
 Simone de Beauvoir
 Simone Porzio
 Simone Weil
 Simple (philosophy)
 Simple commodity production
 Simplicity
 Simplicius of Cilicia
 Simpson's paradox
 Simulacra and Simulation
 Simulacrum
 Simulated reality
 Simulation hypothesis
 Simulator
 Simulism
 Simultaneity
 Sin
 Sincerity
 Sincerity and Authenticity
 Sine qua non
 Singleton set
 Singular term
 Sinn
 Sinsign
 Sir Isaac Newton
 Sir Leslie Stephen
 Sir Robert Filmer
 Sir Thomas More
 Sir William Hamilton, 9th Baronet
 Sirhak
 Siro the Epicurean
 Sissela Bok
 Sisyphus (dialogue)
 Sittlichkeit
 Situated ethics
 Situation ethics
 Situation semantics
 Situation theory
 Situational ethics
 Situationist International
 Situationist Times
 Six Myths about the Good Life
 Skandha
 Skeptic
 Skeptical hypothesis
 Skepticism
 Skeptics
 Sketch for a Theory of the Emotions
 Skolem's paradox
 Skolem–Löwenheim theorem
 Skolem normal form
 Skolem paradox
 Slaughterhouse-Five
 Slave morality
 Slavery
 Slavoj Žižek
 Slavoj Žižek bibliography
 Slavophilism
 Slingshot argument
 Slingshot!
 Slippery slope
 Slippery slope argument
 Sloth (deadly sin)
 Slothful induction
 Slowness (novel)
 Small Pieces Loosely Joined
 Sobornost
 Social action
 Social alienation
 Social Analytics
 Social Anarchism (journal)
 Social Anarchism or Lifestyle Anarchism: An Unbridgeable Chasm
 Social change
 Social choice
 Social Choice and Individual Values
 Social conflict theory
 Social conservatism
 Social constructionism
 Social contract
 Social control
 Social cost
 Social Darwinism
 Social death
 Social degeneration
 Social democracy
 Social determinism
 Social ecology
 Social engineering (political science)
 Social epistemology
 Social equality
 Social exclusion
 Social facts
 Social insertion
 Social justice
 Social Justice in the Liberal State
 Social medicine
 Social mobility
 Social norms
 Social philosophy
 Social progress
 Social realism
 Social reality
 Social responsibility
 Social revolution
 Social Revolutionary Anarchist Federation
 Social rights
 Social semiotics
 Social Solidarity
 Social Statics
 Social theory
 Social Theory and Practice
 Socialism
 Socialist Revolutionary Anarchist Party
 Socially necessary labour time
 Socially responsible investing
 Societal attitudes toward homosexuality
 Societal attitudes towards abortion
 Societas Perfecta
 Society
 Society for Advancing Philosophical Enquiry and Reflection in Education
 Society for Philosophical Inquiry
 Society for Philosophy and Psychology
 Society of Christian Philosophers
 Society of Mind
 Socinianism
 Sociobiology
 Sociocultural evolution
 Sociolect
 Sociological jurisprudence
 Sociology
 Sociology of knowledge
 Socrates
 Socrates Cafe
 Socrates Scholasticus
 Socratic dialogue
 Socratic dialogues
 Socratic irony
 Socratic method
 Socratic paradox
 Socratic problem
 Socratic Puzzles
 Socratic questioning
 Socratici viri
 Soft determinism
 Soft ontology
 Soft paternalism
 Soft tyranny
 Software
 Sokal Affair
 Soku hi
 Sol Garfunkel
 Solidaridad Obrera (historical union)
 Solidaridad Obrera (periodical)
 Solidaridad Obrera (union)
 Solipsism
 Solomon Feferman
 Solomon ibn Gabirol
 Solvitur ambulando
 Somatherapy
 Some Thoughts Concerning Education
 Somnium Scipionis
 Song Du-yul
 Song of God
 Sopater of Apamea
 Sophia (journal)
 Sophia (wisdom)
 Sophie's World
 Sophiology
 Sophism
 Sophismata
 Sophist
 Sophist (dialogue)
 Sophistical Refutations
 Sophists
 Sophocles
 Sophos kagathos
 Sophrosyne
 Søren Kierkegaard
 Søren Kierkegaard and Friedrich Nietzsche
 Søren Kierkegaard bibliography
 Søren Kierkegaard Research Center
 Sorites
 Sorites paradox
 Sortal
 Sosigenes the Peripatetic
 Sosipatra
 Sotades
 Sotāpanna
 Sotion (Pythagorean)
 Soul
 Soul dualism
 Souleymane Bachir Diagne
 Sound bite
 Sound poetry
 Sound symbolism
 Soundness
 Sous rature
 South Park and Philosophy: Bigger, Longer, and More Penetrating
 South Park and Philosophy: You Know, I Learned Something Today
 Sovereignty
 Soviet democracy
 Soviet Nonconformist Art
 Soviet philosophy
 Space
 Space-time
 Space and time
 Space art
 Space Hijackers
 Spaceship Earth
 Spacetime
 Spacing effect
 Spanish Civil War
 Spanish Eclecticism
 Spanish Maquis
 Spanish Revolution
 Spatial-temporal reasoning
 Spatial justice
 Spatial visualization ability
 Special pleading
 Special relativity
 Special senses
 Specialization (logic)
 Specialization of knowledge
 Species
 Species (metaphysics)
 Species problem
 Speciesism
 Specious present
 Spectacle (Situationism)
 Specters of Marx
 Spectrum inversion
 Speculative realism
 Speculative reason
 Speech-acts
 Speech act
 Speech act theory
 Speech acts
 Spencer Heath
 Spengler's civilization model
 Sperone Speroni
 Speusippus
 Sphaerus
 Sphere-world
 Sphota
 Spinoza: Practical Philosophy
 Spinozism
 Spirit
 Spiritism
 Spiritual evolution
 Spiritual materialism
 Spiritual philosophy
 Spirituality
 Spissitude
 Spokescouncil
 Spomenka Hribar
 Sportsmanship
 Spunk Library
 Spurious relationship
 Square of opposition
 Squatting
 Sramanism
 Sri Aurobindo
 St. Petersburg paradox
 Stages on Life's Way
 Stagirite
 Standard model
 Stanford Encyclopedia of Philosophy
 Stanisław Brzozowski (writer)
 Stanisław Ignacy Witkiewicz
 Stanisław Jaśkowski
 Stanisław Leśniewski
 Stanisław Staszic
 Stanley Cavell
 Stanley Eveling
 Stanley Rosen
 Star-free language
 Star height
 Star height problem
 Stasys Šalkauskis
 State and Revolution
 State capitalism
 State function
 State monopoly capitalism
 State of affairs (philosophy)
 State of affairs (sociology)
 State of exception
 State of nature
 State racism
 State space
 State table
 State variable
 State verb
 Stateless communism
 Stateless society
 Statement (logic)
 Statements true in L
 Statesman (dialogue)
 Statism and Anarchy
 Statistical independence
 Statistical law
 Statistical physics
 Statistical probability
 Statistics
 Statolatry
 Status quo bias
 Steampunk Magazine
 Stefan Molyneux
 Stefan Pawlicki
 Stephan A. Hoeller
 Stephan Körner
 Stéphane Lupasco
 Stephanus pagination
 Stephen Batchelor (author)
 Stephen Bronner
 Stephen Cole Kleene
 Stephen David Ross
 Stephen Gaukroger
 Stephen Hicks
 Stephen Laurence
 Stephen Law
 Stephen Menn
 Stephen Mulhall
 Stephen Mumford
 Stephen Neale
 Stephen of Alexandria
 Stephen Pearl Andrews
 Stephen Pepper
 Stephen R. L. Clark
 Stephen R. Marquardt
 Stephen Schiffer
 Stephen Stich
 Stephen Toulmin
 Stephen Yablo
 Steve Fuller (sociologist)
 Steven Best
 Steven Crowell
 Steven Heine
 Steven M. Rosen
 Steven Nadler
 Steven Schwarzschild
 Steven T. Byington
 Steven T. Katz
 Steven Tainer
 Stewart Shapiro
 Sthiramati
 Stilpo
 Stipulative definition
 Stirrings Still: The International Journal of Existential Literature
 Stoa Poikile
 Stochastic process
 Stoic categories
 Stoic passions
 Stoic physics
 Stoicism
 Stoicorum Veterum Fragmenta
 Stone paradox
 Strabo
 Straight and Crooked Thinking
 Straight face test
 Strange loop
 Stranger in a Strange Land
 Strategic essentialism
 Strategy
 Strato of Lampsacus
 Straw man
 Straw man fallacy
 Stream of consciousness (psychology)
 Street poster art
 Strict conditional
 Strict implication
 Strict logic
 Strict partial order
 Stroganov School
 Strong agnosticism
 Structural functionalism
 Structural Marxism
 Structural Pluralism
 Structural rule
 Structural violence
 Structuralism
 Structuralism (philosophy of science)
 Structuration
 Structure
 Structure of Plato's Republic
 Stuart Christie
 Stuart Hampshire
 Stuart Newton Hampshire
 Stuart Wilde
 Stuckism
 Studia Humanista
 Studia Phaenomenologica
 Study skills
 Stupid (art movement)
 Sturgeon's Law
 Sturm und Drang
 Style (visual arts)
 Su Song
 Sub specie aeternitatis
 Subadditivity effect
 Subaltern
 Subconscious mind
 Subhash Kak
 Subject-expectancy effect
 Subject-object based metaphysics
 Subject (philosophy)
 Subject matter expert Turing test
 Subject of labor
 Subjectivation
 Subjective character of experience
 Subjective consciousness
 Subjective expected utility
 Subjective idealism
 Subjective logic
 Subjective probability
 Subjectivism
 Subjectivity
 Subjunctive conditional
 Sublime (philosophy)
 Submission (2004 film)
 Subset
 Subsidiarity
 Subsistence
 Substance theory
 Substantial form
 Substantialism
 Substantive democracy
 Substitutional quantification
 Substratum
 Substructural logic
 Successions of Philosophers
 Suffering
 Sufficient condition
 Sufficient reason
 Sufi cosmology
 Sufi metaphysics
 Sufi philosophy
 Sufism
 Sui generis
 Suicide
 Sukhlal Sanghvi
 Sum of Logic
 Summa
 Summa contra Gentiles
 Summa Theologica
 Summum bonum
 Sun Bin
 Sun Pin
 Sun Tzu
 Sun Yat-sen
 Śūnyatā
 Sunzi
 Supercombinator
 Superego
 Supererogation
 Superfiction
 Superflat
 Superman (Nietzsche)
 Supermind (Integral thought)
 Supernatural
 Supernaturalism
 Superprofit
 Superrationality
 Superseding cause
 Superset
 Supertask
 Supertasks
 Supervaluation
 Supervaluationism
 Supervenience
 Supposition theory
 Suppressed correlative
 Suppression of dissent
 Suprematism
 Supreme Being
 Surendranath Dasgupta
 Sureśvara
 Surface structure
 Surplus product
 Surplus value
 Surrealist automatism
 Susan Alice Buffett
 Susan Bordo
 Susan Haack
 Susan Hurley
 Susan Neiman
 Susan Oyama
 Susan Sontag
 Susan Stebbing
 Susan Wolf
 Susanne Langer
 Suspect classification
 Suspension of disbelief
 Suspension of judgment
 Sutra
 Suzanne Briet
 Suzanne K. Langer
 Suzuki Shōsan
 Svatantrika
 Sven Ove Hansson
 Swami Vivekananda
 Swamping problem
 Swampman
 Sweatshop
 Swedenborgianism
 Sweet Dreams: Philosophical Obstacles to a Science of Consciousness
 Swiss Center for Affective Sciences
 Syādvāda
 Sydney Shoemaker
 Sydney Sparkes Orr
 Syed Ali Abbas Jallapuri
 Syed Muhammad Naquib al-Attas
 Syed Zafarul Hasan
 Syllogism
 Syllogistic fallacy
 Sylvain Maréchal
 Sylvie Le Bon-de Beauvoir
 Symbiomism
 Symbol
 Symbol (formal)
 Symbol grounding
 Symbolic interactionism
 Symbolicum
 Symbolism (arts)
 Symbols
 Symmetric relation
 Symmetrical
 Symmetry
 Sympathy
 Symphony Way Pavement Dwellers
 Symposium (Plato)
 Symposium (Xenophon)
 Symptom
 Syncategorematic
 Syncategorematic term
 Synchronicity
 Syncretism
 Synderesis
 Syndicalism
 Syndicalist Party (1974)
 Synechism
 Synergism (theology)
 Synergy
 Synesthesia
 Synoecism
 Synonymy
 Synoptic philosophy
 Syntactic ambiguity
 Syntactic monoid
 Syntactic predicate
 Syntax
 Syntax (logic)
 Synthese
 Synthetic a priori
 Synthetic proposition
 Synthetic statement
 Syrianus
 System
 Systematic ideology
 Systems analysis
 Systems of Survival
 Systems philosophy
 Systems theory

T 

 T'ai chi ch'uan philosophy
 T'an Ssu-t'ung
 T'i
 T'ien
 T'ien Ming
 T'oegye
 T-schema
 T. A. Goudge
 T. Edward Damer
 T. H. Green
 T. K. Seung
 T. L. S. Sprigge
 T. M. Scanlon
 T.L.S. Sprigge
 Ta Hsueh
 Table of Opposites
 Tabula rasa
 Tachisme
 Tacit assumption
 Tacit knowledge
 Tacitean studies
 Tad Schmaltz
 Tadeusz Czeżowski
 Tadeusz Kotarbinski
 Taftazani
 Tage Lindbom
 Taha Abdurrahman
 Tai Chen
 Taiji
 Takaaki Yoshimoto
 Takamure Itsue
 Taketani Mitsuo
 Takeuti conjecture
 Taking children seriously
 Taking Rights Seriously
 Takis Fotopoulos
 Takiyettin Mengüşoğlu
 Talcott Parsons
 Tamas (philosophy)
 Tan Sitong
 Tanabe Hajime
 Tang Junyi
 Tang Zhen
 Tantra
 Tantraloka
 Tanya
 Tanzan
 Tao
 Tao-hsin
 TAO (collective)
 Tao of Jeet Kune Do
 Tao Te Ching
 Taoism
 Taqi al-Din Ibn Taymiyya
 Tara Smith (philosopher)
 Taranatha
 Taras Kermauner
 Taras Voznyak
 Tarnac Nine
 Tarner Lectures
 Tarot divination
 Tarski's definition of truth
 Tarski's theorem about choice
 Tarski's undefinability theorem
 Taruho Inagaki
 Tashi Tsering (Chenrezig Institute)
 Tashi Tsering (Jamyang Buddhist Centre)
 Tasos Zembylas
 Taste
 Taste (sociology)
 Tathāgata
 Tathagatagarbha doctrine
 Tathātā/Dharmatā
 Tattva (Jainism)
 Tautology (logic)
 Tawhid
 Taxonomy
 Te
 Teaching for social justice
 Teaching Philosophy
 Teachings of Ramakrishna
 Teaism
 Techne
 Technics and Civilization
 Technics and Time, 1
 Techniques of neutralization
 Technocriticism
 Technoethics
 Technological determinism
 Technological rationality
 Technological Somnambulism
 Technologies of the self
 Technology
 Technology assessment
 Technorealism
 Technoromanticism (book)
 Ted Honderich
 Ted Nelson
 Tee (symbol)
 Telauges
 Telecles
 Telekinesis
 Teleological argument
 Teleological argument for the existence of God
 Teleological ethics
 Teleology
 Teleonomy
 Telepathy
 Teles the Cynic
 Telescoping effect
 Telishment
 Telos (journal)
 Telos (philosophy)
 Telos Institute
 Temperance (virtue)
 Temporal finitism
 Temporal logic
 Temporal paradox
 Temporal parts
 Temporal single-system interpretation
 Temporality
 Temporary Autonomous Zone
 Temptation
 Ten Commandments
 Ten Commandments for Drivers
 Ten Days that Shook the World
 Ten Indian commandments
 Ten spiritual realms
 Tendency of the rate of profit to fall
 Tense logic
 Tenth Letter (Plato)
 Teodor Oizerman
 Teorema International Journal of Philosophy
 Teoria dell'Individuo Assoluto
 Terebinthus
 Terence Irwin
 Terence McKenna
 Terence Parsons
 Terenzio, Count Mamiani della Rovere
 Teresa de Lauretis
 Teresa of Avila
 Term logic
 Terminus ad quem
 Ternary logic
 Terpsion
 Terri Schiavo case
 Territorial nationalism
 Terrorism
 Tertium non datur
 Tertullian
 Testability
 Testimony
 Tetractys
 Tetrad (Greek philosophy)
 Tetrapharmakos
 Tetsuro Watsuji
 Tetsuzo Tanikawa
 Texas sharpshooter fallacy
 Thales
 Thales of Miletus
 Thaumaturgy
 The 1 in 12 Club
 The ABC of Communism
 The ABCs of Anarchism
 The Abolition of Work
 The Absence of the Book
 The Adulterous Woman
 The Adventures of Tintin: Breaking Free
 The Age of Reason
 The Age of Reason (Sartre)
 The American Scholar
 The Analysis of Beauty
 The Anarchist's Wife
 The Anarchist Cookbook
 The Anarchists (book)
 The Antichrist (book)
 The Archaeology of Knowledge
 The Aristos
 The Arousal
 The Art of Being Right
 The Art of Loving
 The Art of War
 The Art of Worldly Wisdom
 The Astonishing Hypothesis
 The Athenian Murders
 The Awakening of Faith in Mahāyāna
 The Ayn Rand Lexicon
 The Bertrand Russell Case
 The Birth of the Clinic
 The Birth of Tragedy
 The Black Swan (Taleb book)
 The Blast (newspaper)
 The Blood of Others
 The Bolshevik Myth
 The Book of est
 The Book of Healing
 The Book of Lord Shang
 The Book of Tea
 The Book of the Apple
 The Book on Adler
 The Bounds of Sense
 The British Society for the Philosophy of Religion
 The Call of the Marching Bell
 The Cambridge Dictionary of Philosophy
 The Case for God
 The Case of the Speluncean Explorers
 The Case of Wagner
 The Castle (novel)
 The Century (book)
 The Choice (philosophy book)
 The classical observationalist-inductivist account of science
 The Coming Insurrection
 The Commonwealth of Oceana
 The Communist Manifesto
 The Concept of Anxiety
 The Concept of Law
 The Concept of Mind
 The Concept of the Political
 The Conquest of Bread
 The Consolations of Philosophy
 The Constitution of Liberty
 The Crisis and a Crisis in the Life of an Actress
 The Crock of Gold (novel)
 The Dawn (book)
 The Death of Postmodernism and Beyond
 The Decline of the West
 The Denial of Death
 The Development of Metaphysics in Persia
 The Difference Between Fichte's and Schelling's Systems of Philosophy
 The Doctrine of Fascism
 The Doctrine of Philosophical Necessity Illustrated
 The Doomed City
 The Doors of Perception
 The Educated Mind
 The Ego and Its Own
 The Elements of Moral Philosophy
 The Emperor's New Mind
 The End of Faith
 The End of the Soul
 The Enlightenment
 The Essence of Christianity
 The Establishment
 The Ethics of Liberty
 The Examined Life
 The Existential Negation Campaign
 The Experience Machine
 The Faces of Janus
 The Fall (Albert Camus novel)
 The False Subtlety of the Four Syllogistic Figures
 The Forms
 The Foundations of Arithmetic
 The Fountainhead
 The Free Voice of Labor
 The Freethinker (journal)
 The French Revolution: A History
 The Funeral of the Anarchist Galli
 The Garden (a school of philosophy founded by Epicurus c. 306 BCE)
 The Garden of Cyrus
 The Gay Science
 The Geography of Thought
 The German Ideology
 The Ghost in the Machine
 The Gift (Mauss book)
 The Global Trap
 The God Delusion
 The God Makers
 The God Makers II
 The God of the Machine
 The Golden Ass
 The Golden Rule
 The golden verses of Pythagoras
 The Grammar of Science
 The growth of knowledge
 The Guest (short story)
 The Guide
 The Guide for the Perplexed
 The Handmaid's Tale
 The Harvard Review of Philosophy
 The Hermetic Tradition
 The Hero with a Thousand Faces
 The History of Sexuality
 The Holocaust
 The Human Condition (book)
 The Illuminatus! Trilogy
 The Imaginary (Sartre)
 The Inclusion of the Other
 The Incoherence of the Incoherence
 The Incoherence of the Philosophers
 The International Association for Philosophy and Literature
 The International Library of Psychology, Philosophy and Scientific Method
 The Internationale Hegel-Gesellschaft
 The Internationale Hegel-Vereinigung
 The Journal of Ethics
 The Judgment
 The Kingdom of this World
 The Kyoto University Research Centre for the Cultural Sciences
 The Last Messiah
 The Last of the Masters
 The Law (1850 book)
 The Law of Peoples
 The Laws of Thought
 The Left
 The Legitimation of Power
 The Life of Reason
 The Literary Mind and the Carving of Dragons
 The Logic of Scientific Discovery
 The Logic of Sense
 The Machiavellian Moment
 The Machine in the Garden
 The Machinery of Freedom
 The Market for Liberty
 The Marriage of Heaven and Hell
 The Master and His Emissary
 The Master Key System
 The Master of Go
 The Match!
 The Meaning of Meaning
 The Meaning of Things
 The Mechanism of the Mind
 The Metamorphosis
 The Metaphysical Club
 The Metaphysical Club: A Story of Ideas in America
 The Methods of Ethics
 The Middle Way
 The Mind's I
 The Missing Shade of Blue
 The Monist
 The Moon Is a Harsh Mistress
 The Moral Philosopher and the Moral Life
 The Moviegoer
 The Mystery of the Grail
 The Myth of Sisyphus
 The Myth of the Machine
 The Myth of the Rational Voter: Why Democracies Choose Bad Policies
 The Natural History of Revolution
 The Naturalization of Intentionality
 The Nature of Rationality
 The Nature of Truth
 The Necessity of Atheism
 The New Criterion
 The New York Intellectuals
 The Old Market Autonomous Zone
 The Only Possible Argument in Support of a Demonstration of the Existence of God
 The Open Society and Its Enemies
 The Order of Things
 The Origin of the Family, Private Property and the State
 The Origin of the Work of Art
 The Origins of Virtue
 The Outdatedness of Human Beings
 The Oxford Companion to Philosophy
 The Oxford Dictionary of Philosophy
 The people
 The Perennial Philosophy
 The Phalanx
 The Phenomenology of Spirit
 The Phenomenon of Man
 The Philosopher
 The Philosophers' Football Match
 The Philosophical Discourse of Modernity
 The Philosophical Forum
 The Philosophical Lexicon
 The Philosophical Library
 The Philosophical Quarterly
 The Philosophical Review
 The Philosophical Society of England
 The Philosophy of Friedrich Nietzsche
 The Pigeon (novella)
 The Plague
 The Point of View of My Work as an Author
 The Possessed (play)
 The Postmodern Condition
 The Poverty of Historicism
 The Poverty of Philosophy
 The Praise of Folly
 The Prelude
 The President's Council on Bioethics
 The Prince
 The problem of love
 The Problem of Pain
 The Problems of Philosophy
 The Question Concerning Technology
 The Raven: Anarchist Quarterly
 The Realms of Being
 The Reason of State
 The Rebel (book)
 The Reconstruction of Religious Thought in Islam
 The Relativity of Wrong
 The Renegade (Camus short story)
 The Reprieve
 The Republic (Plato)
 The Republic (Zeno)
 The Rhetoric of Drugs
 The Rhetoric of Hitler's "Battle"
 The Road to Serfdom
 The Roads to Freedom
 The Rod of Moses
 The Roman Revolution
 The Romantic Manifesto
 The Royal Philosophical Society of Glasgow
 The Royal Way
 The Rutherford Journal
 The saying and the said
 The Science of Good and Evil
 The Sea, the Sea
 The Second Sex
 The Secret of Hegel
 The Secret World of Terijian
 The Secrets of Selflessness
 The Secrets of the Self
 The Selfish Genius
 The Seminars of Jacques Lacan
 The Sickness Unto Death
 The Silent Men
 The Simpsons and Philosophy: The D'oh! of Homer
 The Situations and Names of Winds
 The Skeptic's Dictionary
 The Sky Crawlers
 The Social Contract
 The Society of the Spectacle
 The Solar Anus
 The Solitaire Mystery
 The Soul of Man under Socialism
 The State (book)
 The State Is Your Enemy
 The Story of My Heart
 The Story of Philosophy
 The Stranger (Camus novel)
 The Structural Transformation of the Public Sphere
 The Structure of Scientific Revolutions
 The Stuff of Thought
 The Subjection of Women
 The Sublime Object of Ideology
 The survival lottery
 The Survivors of the 'Jonathan'
 The Symbolic Species
 The System of Economic Contradictions, or The Philosophy of Poverty
 The System of Nature
 The Tao of Wu
 The Tao of Zen
 The Theology of Aristotle
 The Theory of Moral Sentiments
 The Theory of Social and Economic Organization
 The Theosophist
 The Thief's Journal
 The Third Policeman
 The Third Wave
 The Threat to Reason
 The Three Types of Legitimate Rule (book)
 The Transcendence of the Ego
 The Transcendentalist
 The Treachery of Images
 The True Word
 The Twenty-First Century City: Resurrecting Urban America
 The Twenty-four Filial Exemplars
 The Two Cultures
 The Tyco Guide to Ethical Conduct
 The Tyranny of Structurelessness
 The Unbearable Lightness of Being
 The Unreality of Time
 The Value of Science
 The Varieties of Religious Experience
 The Virtue of Selfishness
 The Vision of the Anointed
 The Wealth of Nations
 The Will to Believe
 The Will to Power (manuscript)
 The Work of Art in the Age of Mechanical Reproduction
 The World (Descartes)
 The World as Will and Representation
 The World of Null-A
 Theaetetus (dialogue)
 Theagenes of Patras
 Theages
 Theano (philosopher)
 Theaetetus (mathematician)
 Theatre of the Absurd
 Theia mania
 Theism
 Theistic realism
 Themista of Lampsacus
 Themistius
 Theobald Ziegler
 Théodicée
 Theodicy
 Theodor Lessing
 Theodor Lipps
 Theodor Mundt
 Theodor Sternberg
 Theodor W. Adorno
 Theodore de Laguna
 Theodore Drange
 Théodore Eugène César Ruyssen
 Theodore Kaczynski
 Theodore Kisiel
 Theodore Metochites
 Theodore Schick
 Théodore Simon Jouffroy
 Theodoric of Freiberg
 Theodorus of Asine
 Theodorus of Byzantium
 Theodorus of Cyrene
 Theodorus the Atheist
 Théodule Meunier
 Theognostus of Alexandria
 Theological aesthetics
 Theological anthropology
 Theological determinism
 Theological noncognitivism
 Theological veto
 Theological virtues
 Theologico-Political Treatise
 Theology
 Theology of liberation
 Theology of Søren Kierkegaard
 Theon of Smyrna
 Theophilos Corydalleus
 Theophrastus
 Theophrastus Bombastus von Hohenheim
 Theorem
 Theoretical definition
 Theoretical philosophy
 Theoretical reason
 Theoreticism
 Theoria
 Theoria – A Swedish Journal of Philosophy
 Theories
 Theories of humor
 Theories of religion
 Theories of technology
 Theory
 Theory-laden
 Theory and practice
 Theory choice
 Theory of criminal justice
 Theory of descriptions
 Theory of everything (philosophy)
 Theory of forms
 Theory of Forms
 Theory of justification
 Theory of knowledge (IB course)
 Theory of mind
 Theory of relativity
 Theory of Subversion and Containment
 Theory of types
 Theory theory
 Theosophical Society
 Theosophy
 Theosophy (history of philosophy)
 Therapeutic privilege
 Theravada Buddhism
 Therefore sign
 Theresa of Ávila
 Thermodynamics
 Theses on Feuerbach
 Thesis
 Thesis, antithesis, synthesis
 Theurgy
 Thick Black Theory
 Thick concept
 Thierry de Duve
 Thierry of Chartres
 Thieves in Black
 Thing in itself
 Things
 Think (journal)
 Think: A Compelling Introduction to Philosophy
 Thinker's Library
 Thinking
 Thinking about Consciousness
 Third-cause fallacy
 Third camp
 Third eye
 Third man argument
 Third Position
 Third Way (centrism)
 Thirdness
 Thirteen Classics
 Thirtha prabandha
 Thisness
 Thomas-Institut
 Thomas A Kempis
 Thomas A. McCarthy
 Thomas Abbt
 Thomas Aquinas
 Thomas Aquinas and the Sacraments
 Thomas Baldwin (philosopher)
 Thomas Bradwardine
 Thomas Brown (philosopher)
 Thomas Browne
 Thomas Cajetan
 Thomas Carlyle
 Thomas Common
 Thomas Cooper (US politician)
 Thomas Davidson (philosopher)
 Thomas Gallus
 Thomas Gisborne
 Thomas Hastie Bell
 Thomas Hemerken
 Thomas Henry Huxley
 Thomas Hill Green
 Thomas Hobbes
 Thomas J. McKay
 Thomas Jay Oord
 Thomas Jefferson
 Thomas Keell
 Thomas Kuhn
 Thomas Metzinger
 Thomas Molnar
 Thomas More
 Thomas Munro
 Thomas Nagel
 Thomas of Sutton
 Thomas of Villanova
 Thomas of York (Franciscan)
 Thomas Paine
 Thomas Percival
 Thomas Pogge
 Thomas Reid
 Thomas Robert Malthus
 Thomas S. Kuhn
 Thomas Samuel Kuhn
 Thomas Spencer Baynes
 Thomas Talbott
 Thomas Taylor (neoplatonist)
 Thomas Tymoczko
 Thomas V. Morris
 Thomas Vaughan (philosopher)
 Thomas White
 Thomas Wilton
 Thome H. Fang
 Thomism
 Thoralf Skolem
 Þorsteinn Gylfason
 Thought
 Thought experiment
 Thought Forms
 Thought of Thomas Aquinas
 Thoughtform
 Thoughts on Machiavelli
 Thoughts on the True Estimation of Living Forces
 Thrasymachus
 Thrasymachus of Corinth
 Three-valued logic
 Three Critics of the Enlightenment
 Three Dialogues between Hylas and Philonous
 Three marks of existence
 Three men make a tiger
 Three Principles of the People
 Three sided football
 Three Treasures (Taoism)
 Three Worlds Theory
 Threefold Training
 Thrownness
 Thubten Gyatso (Australian monk)
 Thucydides
 Thumos
 Thus Spoke Zarathustra
 Ti (concept)
 Tian
 Tibetan Buddhism
 Tibor R. Machan
 Ticking time bomb scenario
 Tilman Pesch
 Tim Crane
 Tim Dean
 Timaeus (dialogue)
 Timaeus of Locri
 Timaeus the Sophist
 Time
 Time and Free Will
 Time loop
 Time preference
 Time slice
 Time travel
 Timeline of Eastern philosophers
 Timeline of Niccolò Machiavelli
 Timeline of philosophers
 Timeline of Western philosophers
 Timo Airaksinen
 Timocrates of Lampsacus
 Timolaus of Cyzicus
 Timon (philosopher)
 Timon of Philius
 Timon of Phlius
 Timothy Chambers
 Timothy Smiley
 Timothy Sprigge
 Timothy Williamson
 Timycha
 Tine Hribar
 Tiqqun
 Tirukkuṛaḷ
 Tiruvalluvar
 Tisias
 Titoism
 Titus Albucius
 Titus Brandsma
 Titus Pomponius Atticus
 To be
 Todd May
 Toegye
 Toju Nakae
 Token
 Token-type distinction
 Toleration
 Tolstoyan
 Tom Beauchamp
 Tom Gerety
 Tom Polger
 Tom Regan
 Tom Stoneham
 Tomáš Garrigue Masaryk
 Tomer Devorah
 Tommaso Campanella
 Tommaso Maria Zigliara
 Tomonubu Imamichi
 Tonghak
 Tonk
 Tõnu Trubetsky
 Tony Honoré
 Tony McWalter
 Toothpaste tube theory
 Top-down
 Top-down parsing language
 Top down
 Topical logic
 Topics (Aristotle)
 Topus Uranus
 Torbjörn Tännsjö
 Tore Nordenstam
 Torgny T:son Segerstedt
 Toronto School of communication theory
 Torquato Accetto
 Torsti Lehtinen
 Torture
 Tory corporatism
 Total ordering
 Totalism
 Totalitarian democracy
 Totalitarianism
 Tottenham Outrage
 Tout court
 Towards a Global Ethic: An Initial Declaration
 Toxin puzzle
 Trace (deconstruction)
 Trace monoid
 Trace theory
 Tractarian
 Tractatus coislinianus
 Tractatus de Intellectus Emendatione
 Tractatus Logico-Philosophicus
 Trademark argument
 Tradition
 Traditionalism
 Traditionalist conservatism
 Traditionalist School
 Traducianism
 Tragedy
 Tragedy of the commons
 Tragic Week (Catalonia)
 Trail ethics
 Trailokya
 Trairūpya
 Trait ascription bias
 Tran Duc Thao
 Transaction logic
 Transcendence (philosophy)
 Transcendence (religion)
 Transcendent theosophy
 Transcendental apperception
 Transcendental argument
 Transcendental argument for the existence of God
 Transcendental arguments
 Transcendental idealism
 Transcendental number
 Transcendental perspectivism
 Transcendental realism
 Transcendental Students
 Transcendental theology
 Transcendentalism
 Transcendentals
 Transferable utility
 Transfinite induction
 Transfinite number
 Transformation problem
 Transformation rule
 Transformational grammar
 Transformative justice
 Transhumanism
 Transitional demand
 Transitive closure
 Transitive relation
 Translating "law" to other European languages
 Translation
 Translators
 Transmigration of the soul
 Transmodernism
 Transmodernity
 Transparency (linguistic)
 Transparency (philosophy)
 Transparent Intensional Logic
 Transposition (logic)
 Transtheistic
 Transubstantiation
 Transvaluation of values
 Transworld identity
 Traugott Konstantin Oesterreich
 Treatise
 Tree of Porphyry
 Trenton Merricks
 Tresconsciousness
 Triage
 Trial of Socrates
 Trial of the thirty
 Trialism
 Trichotomy (philosophy)
 Trikaya
 Trilemma
 Trinitarianism
 Trinity
 Tripitaka
 Tripp York
 Triune Continuum Paradigm
 Trivial objections
 Trivialism
 Trolley problem
 Trope (philosophy)
 Trope of Litotes
 Troubled Sleep
 True-believer syndrome
 True name
 Truism
 Truman G. Madsen
 Trumbullplex
 Trust (social sciences)
 Trust (sociology)
 Trustworthiness
 Truth
 Truth-conditional semantics
 Truth-function
 Truth-functions
 Truth-value
 Truth-value link
 Truth-value semantics
 Truth and Method
 Truth by consensus
 Truth claim (photography)
 Truth condition
 Truth conditions
 Truth definition
 Truth function
 Truth predicate
 Truth table
 Truth theory
 Truth value
 Truthbearer
 Truthiness
 Truthlikeness
 Truthmaker
 Tsang Lap Chuen
 Tschandala
 Tsung-Mi
 Tu quoque
 Tudor Vianu
 Tuesdays with Morrie
 Tui (intellectual)
 Tuli Kupferberg
 Tullia d'Aragona
 Tung Chung-shu
 Turing degree
 Turing degrees
 Turing machine
 Turing machine equivalents
 Turing machines
 Turing reducibility
 Turing test
 Türker armaner
 Turtles all the way down
 Tusculanae Quaestiones
 Twardowski
 Twelfth Letter (Plato)
 Twelve Nidānas
 Twentieth-century French philosophy
 Twilight Club
 Twilight of the Idols
 Twin Earth thought experiment
 Two-level utilitarianism
 Two Ages: A Literary Review
 Two Concepts of Liberty
 Two Dogmas of Empiricism
 Two Treatises of Government
 Two truths doctrine
 Two wrongs make a right
 Tychism
 Tyler Burge
 Type (metaphysics)
 Type-E Dualism
 Type-identity theory
 Type-token distinction
 Type-type identity
 Type (metaphysics)
 Type identity
 Type materialism
 Type physicalism
 Type theory
 Types of Buddha
 Typification
 Tyranny of the majority
 Tzvetan Todorov

U 

 U. G. Krishnamurti
 Ubasute
 Übermensch
 Ubuntu (philosophy)
 Uchiyama Gudō
 UCLA Department of Philosophy
 Udana
 Udayana
 Uddyotakara
 Udyotakara
 Ueyama Shunpei
 Ugliness
 Ugly duckling theorem
 Ugo Spirito
 Uisang
 Ûisang
 Uku Masing
 Ullin Place
 Ülo Kaevats
 Ulrich Libbrecht
 Ulrich of Strasbourg
 Ulrich of Strasburg
 Ulrik Huber
 Ultimate Boeing 747 gambit
 Ultimate fate of the universe
 Ultra-imperialism
 Ultrafinitism
 Umanità Nova
 Umberto Eco
 Umberto Eco bibliography
 Umehara Takeshi
 Unabomber for President
 Uncertainty
 Uncertainty principle
 Unconscious mind
 Unconsciousness
 Unconventional Action
 Uncountable
 Undecidable problem
 Underconsumption
 Underdetermination
 Understanding
 Understanding Consciousness
 Undistributed middle
 Undoing Gender
 Unequal exchange
 Unexpected hanging paradox
 Unhappy consciousness
 Unified science
 Unified Science
 Uniform Rights of the Terminally Ill Act
 Uniformitarianism
 Union flying squad
 Unione Sindacale Italiana
 Unique name assumption
 Uniquely Inversible Grammar
 Uniqueness quantification
 Unit-point atomism
 Unitarianism
 Unitary urbanism
 Unity in diversity
 Unity of opposites
 Unity of science
 Unity of the proposition
 Universal (metaphysics)
 Universal characteristic
 Universal class
 Universal code (ethics)
 Universal dialectic
 Universal generalization
 Universal grammar
 Universal instantiation
 Universal language
 Universal law
 Universal mind
 Universal Natural History and Theory of Heaven
 Universal pragmatics
 Universal prescriptivism
 Universal proposition
 Universal quantification
 Universal quantifier
 Universal reason
 Universal science
 Universal value
 Universalism
 Universality (philosophy)
 Universalizability
 Universals
 Universe
 Universe of discourse
 University of Constantinople
 University Philosophical Society (Trinity College, Dublin)
 Universology
 Univocity
 Unknowable
 Unknown unknown
 Unmoved mover
 Unobservable
 Unorganisation
 Unrestricted grammar
 Unsolved problems in philosophy
 Untimely Meditations (Nietzsche)
 Unweaving the Rainbow
 Up Against the Wall Motherfuckers
 Upadhi
 Upanishads
 Upaya
 Upeksa
 Urban secession
 Urbano González Serrano
 Urdoxa
 Uri Gordon
 Uriel da Costa
 Urso of Calabria
 Ursula Wolf
 Uruguayan Anarchist Federation
 Use–mention distinction
 Use of performance-enhancing drugs in sport
 Use value
 Useless rules
 User illusion
 Usury
 Utah Phillips
 Utamakura
 Utilitarian bioethics
 Utilitarianism
 Utilitarianism (book)
 Utility
 Utility function
 Utility monster
 Utopia
 Utopianism
 Utpaladeva
 Uttara Mimamsa
 Utterance

V 

 V (comics)
 V for Vendetta
 V. Y. Mudimbe
 Vācaspati Miśra
 Václav Bělohradský
 Vacuous
 Vacuous truth
 Vagbhatananda Gurudevar
 Vagrant predicate
 Vagueness
 Vaisesika
 Vaiśesika
 Vaisheshika
 Val Plumwood
 Valence effect
 Valentin A. Bazhanov
 Valentin Ferdinandovich Asmus
 Valentinianism
 Valentinus (Gnostic)
 Valeriano Orobón Fernández
 Validity (logic)
 VALIS
 Vallabha Acharya
 Vallabhacharya
 Valorisation
 Value-form
 Value (ethics)
 Value added
 Value judgment
 Value of control
 Value of Earth
 Value of information
 Value of life
 Value pluralism
 Value product
 Value system
 Value theory
 Values
 Vancouver guidelines
 Vanishing mediator
 Vanity
 Vanja Sutlić
 Varadaraja V. Raman
 Varieties of democracy
 Varlam Cherkezishvili
 Vāsanā
 Vasilii Rozanov
 Vasilii Vasil'evich Rozanov
 Vasily Jakovlevich Zinger
 Vasily Nalimov
 Vasily Rozanov
 Vasubandhu
 Vatsyayana
 Vātsyāyana
 Vauvenargues
 Vazgen I
 Veda
 Vedanta
 Vedānta
 Vedas
 Vegan Outreach
 Veganarchism
 Vegetarianism
 veil of ignorance
 Veil of perception
 Venn diagram
 Vergangenheitsbewältigung
 Verification
 Verification principle
 Verification theory
 Verificationism
 Verisimilitude
 Veritatis Splendor
 Veritism
 Vernon Lee
 Verstehen
 Vianney Décarie
 Vice
 Vices
 Vicious circle
 Vicious circle principle
 Vicious regress
 Victor Basch
 Victor Cousin
 Victor d'Hupay
 Victor Dave
 Victor Kraft
 Victor Ovcharenko
 Victor Reppert
 Victor Robinson
 Victoria Camps
 Victoria Institute
 Victoria, Lady Welby
 Vienna Circle
 Views from the Real World
 Vigdis Songe-Møller
 Vijnanabhiksu
 Vijnanavada
 Vijñānavāda
 Viktor Grigoryevich Afanasyev
 Vilém Flusser
 Vilfredo Pareto
 Vilhjálmur Árnason
 Villa Amalia (Athens)
 Vincent Cespedes
 Vincent Descombes
 Vincent F. Hendricks
 Vincent Ferrer
 Vincent Miceli
 Vincenzo Gioberti
 Vincible ignorance
 Violence
 Violinist (thought experiment)
 Vipāka
 Vipassana
 Vipassanā
 Vipassana movement
 Virgil Aldrich
 Virtù
 Virtual (philosophy)
 Virtue
 Virtue epistemology
 Virtue ethics
 Virtue jurisprudence
 Virtue theory
 Virtues
 Virtuous circle
 Virtus (virtue)
 Vishishtadvaita
 Vishnu
 Vision (religion)
 Visions of Order
 Vissarion Belinsky
 Visual arts and design
 Visual ethics
 Visual literacy
 Visual modularity
 Visual reasoning
 Visual rhetoric
 Vital du Four
 Vitalism
 Vittorio Hösle
 Vittorio Vettori
 Vivekachudamani
 Vladimir Dvorniković
 Vladimir Hütt
 Vladimir Il'ich Lenin
 Vladimir Ilich Lenin
 Vladimir Ilyich Ulyanov Lenin
 Vladimir Jankélévitch
 Vladimir Lenin
 Vladimir Odoevsky
 Vladimir Solovyov (philosopher)
 Void (Śūnyatā) 
 Voidism
 Vojin Rakic
 Volcano School
 Volin
 Volition
 Volker Zotz
 Voltaire
 Voltairine de Cleyre
 Voluntarism
 Voluntarism (action)
 Voluntarism (metaphysics)
 Voluntarism (theology)
 Voluntary active euthanasia
 Voluntary compliance
 Voluntary euthanasia
 Voluntary Socialism
 Voluntaryism
 Von Restorff effect
 Voodoo science
 Voting paradox
 Vulnerability
 Vyacheslav Ivanov
 Vyasa
 Vyasatirtha
 Vydūnas

W 

 W. B. Gallie
 W. D. Ross
 W. E. Johnson
 W. Hugh Woodin
 W. K. C. Guthrie
 W.D. Ross
 W.E. Johnson
 Wabi-sabi
 Wacker von Wackenfels
 Wage labour
 Wage slavery
 Wagnerism
 Waiting for Godot
 Waking Life
 Walda Heywat
 Walden
 Walking Stewart
 Walpola Rahula
 Walsall Anarchists
 Walter Benjamin
 Walter Berns
 Walter Burley
 Walter Charleton
 Walter Chatton
 Walter Dubislav
 Walter Ehrlich
 Walter Goodnow Everett
 Walter J. Ong
 Walter Kaufmann (philosopher)
 Walter of Bruges
 Walter of Mortagne
 Walter of St Victor
 Walter of Winterburn
 Walter Pater
 Walter Pitts
 Walter S. Gamertsfelder
 Walter Schulz (philosopher)
 Walter Terence Stace
 Wang Bi
 Wang Ch'ung
 Wang Chong
 Wang Chuanshan
 Wang Fu-chih
 Wang Fu (philosopher)
 Wang Fuzhi
 Wang Ruoshui
 Wang Yang-ming
 Wang Yangming
 War and peace
 War and Peace
 War and philosophy
 War in the Age of Intelligent Machines
 War of all against all
 War of Anti-Christ with the Church and Christian Civilization
 Ward Jones
 Warren Ashby
 Warren Buffett
 Warren Goldfarb
 Warren Shibles
 Warwick Fox
 Watchmaker analogy
 Waterland (novel)
 Watsuji Tetsuro
 Watsuji Tetsurō
 Wawrzyniec Grzymała Goślicki
 Waynflete Professorship
 We the Living
 We will bury you
 Weak agnosticism
 Weak law of large numbers
 Weak ontology
 Weakness of will
 Weber–Fechner law
 Wei Wu Wei
 Weighted context-free grammar
 Welfare (financial aid)
 Welfare economics
 Welfare liberalism
 Welfarism
 Well-being
 Well-formed formula
 Well-founded phenomenon
 Well-ordered set
 Well ordered set
 Well ordering
 Well travelled road effect
 Weltanschauung
 Wen-tzu
 Wendell Berry
 Wenzi
 Werner Erhard (book)
 Werner Hamacher
 Werner Heisenberg
 Werner Krieglstein
 Wesley C. Salmon
 Wesley Newcomb Hohfeld
 Wesley Salmon
 Wesleyan Philosophical Society
 Western Cape Anti-Eviction Campaign
 Western painting
 Western philosophy
 Wetware (brain)
 Wff
 What Computers Can't Do
 What I Believe
 What Is Art?
 What Is Literature?
 What Is Property?
 What Is This Thing Called Science?
 What Is Your Dangerous Idea?
 What should then be done O people of the East
 What the Tortoise Said to Achilles
 What We Believe But Cannot Prove
 Wheel of life
 When a white horse is not a horse
 Where Mathematics Comes From
 Whistleblower
 White's Professor of Moral Philosophy
 Whiteway Colony
 Whitny Braun
 Why I Am Not a Christian
 Why Truth Matters
 Widow's Walk (novel)
 Wiener Moderne
 Wilbur Marshall Urban
 Wild law
 Wildness
 Wilfrid Desan
 Wilfrid Sellars
 Wilfrid Stalker Sellars
 Wilhelm Dilthey
 Wilhelm Gottlieb Tennemann
 Wilhelm Heinrich Wackenroder
 Wilhelm Homberg
 Wilhelm Jerusalem
 Wilhelm Maximilien Wundt
 Wilhelm Ostwald
 Wilhelm Reich
 Wilhelm Schuppe
 Wilhelm Traugott Krug
 Wilhelm von Humboldt
 Wilhelm Windelband
 Wilhelm Wundt
 Will (philosophy)
 Will Durant
 Will Kymlicka
 Will to believe doctrine
 Will to live
 Will to power
 Willard Van Orman Quine
 Willem B. Drees
 William A. Earle
 William Alston
 William Alvin Howard
 William Angus Knight
 William Barrett (philosopher)
 William Bechtel
 William Blackstone
 William Buwalda
 William C. Dowling
 William C. Wimsatt
 William Calvert Kneale
 William Chillingworth
 William Chittick
 William Cleghorn
 William Craig (philosopher)
 William Crathorn
 William David Ross
 William de la Mare
 William Desmond (philosopher)
 William Drummond of Logiealmond
 William Duncan (philosopher)
 William E. Connolly
 William E. Kaufman
 William Ernest Hocking
 William Ernest Johnson
 William F. Vallicella
 William Fontaine
 William Frankena
 William G. Lycan
 William Galston
 William Godwin
 William Graham Sumner
 William Hamilton
 William Hare (philosopher)
 William Hatcher Davis
 William Herbert Dray
 William Heytesbury
 William Hirstein
 William Irwin (philosopher)
 William Irwin Thompson
 William J. Richardson
 William James
 William James Lectures
 William K. Frankena
 William Kingdon Clifford
 William Kneale
 William Kurtz Wimsatt, Jr.
 William L. Reese
 William L. Rowe
 William Lane Craig
 William Law
 William Lawvere
 William Lee Bradley
 William Lowe Bryan
 William Lycan
 William Mackintire Salter
 William Manderstown
 William McDougall
 William McDougall (psychologist)
 William McNeill (philosopher)
 William Mitchell (philosopher)
 William Newton-Smith
 William Occam
 William Ockham
 William of Alnwick
 William of Auvergne (bishop)
 William of Auvergne, Bishop of Paris
 William of Auxerre
 William of Champeaux
 William of Conches
 William of Falgar
 William of Heytesbury
 William of Lucca
 William of Moerbeke
 William of Ockham
 William of Saint-Amour
 William of Sherwood
 William of Ware
 William Paley
 William Pepperell Montague
 William Ralph Inge
 William Ritchie Sorley
 William S. Hatcher
 William S. Sahakian
 William Shaw (philosopher)
 William Sherwood
 William Stanley Jevons
 William Stoddart
 William Sweet
 William Temple (archbishop)
 William Temple (logician)
 William Thompson (Cork)
 William Thompson (philosopher)
 William Torrey Harris
 William W. Tait
 William Wallace (Scottish philosopher)
 William Warren Bartley
 William Whewell
 William Wollaston
 Wincenty Lutosławski
 Wirth–Weber precedence relationship
 Wirth syntax notation
 Wisdom
 Wisdom of repugnance
 Wise old man
 Wishful thinking
 Wissenschaftslehre
 Witelo
 Witness argument
 Wittgenstein's Beetle (and other classic thought experiments)
 Wittgenstein's Mistress
 Wittgenstein's Poker: The Story of a Ten-Minute Argument Between Two Great Philosophers
 Wittgenstein (film)
 Wittgenstein on Rules and Private Language
 Władysław Heinrich
 Władysław Mieczysław Kozłowski
 Władysław Tatarkiewicz
 Władysław Weryho
 Wolfgang Fritz Haug
 Wolfgang Harich
 Wolfgang Kohler
 Wolfgang Köhler
 Wolfgang Smith
 Wolfgang Stegmüller
 Wolfi Landstreicher
 Womb Realm
 WOMBLES
 Women and children first (protocol)
 Women in philosophy
 Won Gwang
 Wonch'uk
 Wonchuk
 Wonderism
 Wonhyo
 Wōnhyo
 Woo Tsin-hang
 Wooden iron
 Word and Object
 Word problem (computability)
 Word sense
 Work ethic
 Work of art
 Workerism
 Workers' control
 Workers' Initiative
 Workers Solidarity
 Workers Solidarity Alliance
 Working hypothesis
 Works
 Works by Thomas Aquinas
 Works of Love
 Works of Madhvacharya
 World-soul
 World (philosophy)
 World communism
 World Congress of Philosophy
 World disclosure
 World Hypotheses
 World riddle
 World Trade Organization Ministerial Conference of 1999 protest activity
 World view
 Worldcentrism
 Worldline
 Worldview
 Worse-than-average effect
 Writing Sampler
 Writings of Marcus Tullius Cicero
 Wrong
 Wrong direction
 Wronger than wrong
 Wú (negative)
 Wu Enyu
 Wu Qi
 Wu wei
 Wuji (philosophy)
 Wuzhen pian

X 

 Xavier Zubiri
 Xeer
 Xenarchus of Seleucia
 Xeniades
 Xenocrates
 Xenophanes
 Xenophilus
 Xenophon
 Xenotransplantation
 Xi Kang
 Xiaozi
 Ximen Bao
 Xiong Shili
 Xu Ai
 Xu Liangying
 Xu Youyu
 Xuanxue
 Xuanzang
 Xun Zi

Y 

 Yaaqūb ibn Ishāq al-Kindī
 Yabo
 Yajnavalkya
 Yale school (deconstruction)
 Yamaga Sokō
 Yamazaki Ansai
 Yang
 Yang Chu
 Yang Rongguo
 Yang Xiong (author)
 Yang Zhu
 Yaron Brook
 Yasovijaya
 Ye Shi
 Yehoshua Bar-Hillel
 Yehouda Shenhav
 Yen Yuan
 Yeshayahu Leibowitz
 Yi Ching
 Yi Hwang
 Yi I
 Yi Saek
 Yi Xing
 Yi Yulgok
 Yiannis N. Moschovakis
 Yiannis Psychopedis
 Yijing
 Yin and yang
 Yoga
 Yogacara
 Yogācāra Buddhism
 Yogi Berra
 Yohanan Alemanno
 Yoichiro Murakami
 Yong
 Yongjia School
 Yorkshire Philosophical Society
 You're either with us, or against us
 Young Hegelians
 Youssef Seddik (philosopher)
 Yuga
 Yumo Mikyo Dorje
 Yunmen Wenyan
 Yuquan Shenxiu
 Yuri Matiyasevich
 Yusuf Balasaghuni
 Yves Brunsvick
 Yves Simon (philosopher)

Z 

 Zabalaza Anarchist Communist Federation
 Zadig
 Zaki Naguib Mahmoud
 Zapatista Army of National Liberation
 Zarathustra's roundelay
 Zarathustra (fictional philosopher)
 Zaum
 ZC
 Zdeněk Neubauer
 Zeami Motokiyo
 Zeigarnik effect
 Zeitgeist
 Zen
 Zen and the Art of Motorcycle Maintenance
 Zen and the Brain
 Zenarchy
 Zengcius
 Zengzi
 Zeno's paradoxes
 Zeno of Citium
 Zeno of Elea
 Zeno of Sidon
 Zeno of Tarsus
 Zeno Vendler
 Zenobius
 Zenodotus (philosopher)
 Zenon Pylyshyn
 Zera Yacob
 Zermelo–Fraenkel set theory
 Zero-risk bias
 Zero-sum
 Zeroth-order logic
 ZF
 ZFC
 Zhan Ruoshui
 Zhang Dongsun
 Zhang Guoxiang
 Zhang Heng
 Zhang Zai
 Zhao Tingyang
 Zhe school (painting)
 Zheng Xuan
 Zhenren
 Zhentong
 Zhi
 Zhi Dun
 Zhiyi
 Zhongyong
 Zhou Dunyi
 Zhou Guoping
 Zhu Qianzhi
 Zhu Xi
 Zhu Xueqin
 Zhuangzi
 Zhuangzi (book)
 Zi Chan
 Zimboe
 Zinaida Ignatyeva
 Zine library
 Zionism
 Zisi
 Zo d'Axa
 Zofia Zdybicka
 Zohar
 Zoilus
 Zollikon Seminars
 Zombie
 Zongmi
 Zoran Đinđić
 Zorn's lemma
 Zoroaster
 Zoroastrianism
 Zou Yan
 Zweckrationalität
 Zygmunt Łempicki
 Zygmunt Zawirski

Philosophy